Dark Moon Rising (aka Wolf Moon) is a 2009 American horror film directed by Dana Mennie who also co-wrote the movie with Ian Cook. The film is about a small town girl, Amy (played by Ginny Weirick), who falls for wanderer Chris Diveccio. The film also stars María Conchita Alonso and Max Ryan as two local townspeople who try to save the town from destruction.

Plot 
A girl named Amy falls in love with the new boy in town. Dan is a drifter from out of town who carries a dark secret with him.

In the beginning Amy's friends tell her to go talk to Dan, who is working in an auto shop. He treats Amy with disinterest until he realizes that he has hurt her feelings. He asks to give her a ride home. Amy's father doesn't trust Dan from the beginning. Dan's a drifter, so people automatically don't trust him. But, the reason people don't trust him is because of the vibes he gives off. Amy and Dan get to know each other as the movie progresses. Meanwhile, Dan's father, Bender, is out killing people only a few states over. Dan's dad eventually shows up and kills a dog along with a horse. Sam, the local sheriff and Amy's dad, investigate the murders and eventually connect them to the killings from other states. The two eventually discover Charles Thibodeaux. Charles tells them that he knows Bender from a while ago and Bender is a werewolf. Charles put Bender in jail a while back, and he escaped seeking revenge. Bender killed Charles' wife brutally and Charles never got over it.

Characters 
Max Ryan as Darkman/Bender
María Conchita Alonso as Sam
Chris Mulkey as John
Sid Haig as Crazy Louis
Chris Diveccio as Dan
Billy Drago as Charles Thibodeaux
Lin Shaye as Sunny
Arielle Vandenberg as Nicole
Rikki Gagne as Stacey
Norman Mora as Chico
Ginny Weirick as Amy

Reception

About the director
Dark Moon Rising is Dana Mennie's debut film. Dana Mennie also wrote, produced, and starred in Dark Moon Rising.  Dana was at first against casting Chris DiVeccio as Dan, but Chris had a friend that was close to Dana and he was eventually persuaded.

Release
Dark Moon Rising was a selection at the Freak Show Horror Film Festival on October 10, 2009.

It was released on DVD June 22, 2010 under the title Wolf Moon.

References

External links 
Movie website
IMDb

2009 films
American supernatural horror films
American werewolf films
2000s English-language films
2000s American films